Uncrowned King of Scotland may refer to:

Archibald Campbell, 3rd Duke of Argyll
Henry Dundas, 1st Viscount Melville
Idi Amin

See also
 The Last King of Scotland